Robert James Shave Jr. (born c.1936) is an American professional golfer.

Shave was born in Willoughby, Ohio. He played college golf at Florida State University, where he was a 2nd-Team All-American.

He played on the PGA Tour for six years, and had 21 top-10 finishes. In other professional outings, he won the Ohio Open three times, as well as the Pennsylvania Open Championship.

He would later coach golf at Florida International University along with Bill Mehlhorn. Mehlhorn and Shave wrote the book, Golf Secrets Exposed, in the early 1980s to summarize Mehlhorn's golf secrets and insight. Shave was elected into the Florida State Hall of Fame in 2009.

Amateur wins
1956 Northeast Ohio Amateur Championship
1958 Northeast Ohio Amateur Championship
1959 Northeast Ohio Amateur Championship
1959 Pensacola Invitational

Professional wins (4)
1958 Ohio Open (as an amateur)
1962 Ohio Open
1963 Ohio Open
1965 Pennsylvania Open Championship

References

American male golfers
Florida State Seminoles men's golfers
PGA Tour golfers
College golf coaches in the United States
Golfers from Ohio
FIU Panthers coaches
FIU Panthers golf
Sportspeople from Cleveland
People from Willoughby, Ohio
People from Weston, Florida
1936 births
Living people